Burgimakmakhi (Dargwa: Бурхӏимякьмахьи) is a rural locality (a selo) and the administrative centre of Burgimakmakhinsky Selsoviet, Akushinsky District, Republic of Dagestan, Russia. The population was 1,285 as of 2010. There are 3 streets.

Geography 
Burgimakmakhi is located 7 km northeast of Akusha (the district's administrative centre) by road. Kakmakhi is the nearest rural locality.

References 

Rural localities in Akushinsky District